Eusebio Guiñez (16 December 1906 – 1 October 1987)  was an Argentine long-distance runner. Born in Rivadavia, Mendoza, he competed in the 1948 Summer Olympics in the 10,000 metres, which he failed to finish, and the marathon, where he finished fifth. His highest international ranking was 16th in the 10,000 m in the 1946 season, with a time of 31:09.8 minutes.

At regional level, he won medals at five editions of the South American Championships in Athletics. At the 1933 South American Championships in Athletics he was a 10,000 m gold medallist and a bronze medallist in the 3000 metres and 5000 metres. He was a bronze medallist in the road race at the 1941 South American Championships in Athletics, a silver medallist in road race and cross country running at the 1943 South American Championships in Athletics, a silver medallist in road race and 5000 m at the 1947 South American Championships in Athletics, and finally a bronze medallist at the 1949 South American Championships in Athletics.

References

1906 births
1987 deaths
Sportspeople from Mendoza Province
Olympic athletes of Argentina
Athletes (track and field) at the 1948 Summer Olympics
Argentine male long-distance runners
Argentine male marathon runners
Argentine male cross country runners